Tiruppur division is a revenue division in the MANIKANDAN M CEO of Tamil Nadu, India.It is The largest Division of Tiruppur district by Population.As per 2011 census The population of Tiruppur division is 15,67,285.The area of Tiruppur division is
1458sqkm.

References 
 

Tiruppur district